Tekko (formerly Tekkoshocon) is an annual four-day anime convention held during July at the David L. Lawrence Convention Center in Pittsburgh, Pennsylvania. The convention has been held in various locations around the Pittsburgh metropolitan area and is run by a non-profit organization, the Pittsburgh Japanese Culture Society (PJCS).<ref name="AC-PJCS"/ Tekkoshocon's name was a blend of the Japanese word tekkosho, meaning steel mill (a reference to Pittsburgh's industrial steel-producing history), and adapting the suffix "-con" (from convention), which is a common nomenclature archetype among such conventions.

Programming
The convention typically offers an AMV contest, anime viewings, concerts, cosplay masquerade, costume competitions, dance/rave, dance competition, dealers' room, fashion shows, formal ball, gaming (board, LARP, table top, trading card), karaoke room, panels, video game tournaments, and workshops. Tekko has held charity events since 2006 supporting organizations such as the National Ovarian Cancer Coalition, and in 2011 the Cystic Fibrosis Foundation, Gackt's "Show Your Heart" charity, and Greater Pittsburgh Community Food Bank. The concerts at Tekko have drawn significant attendees, with over 900 for the Rampant concert in 2011, over 1,000 for Exist Trace in 2012, and 1,100 for Dazzle Vision & Cantoy in 2013. Tekko contributed almost three million dollars to the Pittsburgh economy in 2014, growing to nearly four million (3.7 mil) in 2015, and $4.7 million in 2016.

History
In 2002 the first attempt to hold an anime convention in Pittsburgh, Takocon, failed due to a booking problem at the Pittsburgh Marriott City Center and the lack of time to acquire additional space. In 2003, the first Tekkoshocon was organized by Rebecca Roach and occurred at the Wyndham Pittsburgh Airport. In 2004, the convention moved to the Pittsburgh Marriott North and became three days. From 2005 to 2007 Tekkoshocon was held in the Pittsburgh ExpoMart/Radisson Hotel Pittsburgh, but due to unexpected demolition work, Tekkoshocon moved to the Radisson Hotel Pittsburgh Green Tree for 2008.

Tekkoshocon moved to the larger David L. Lawrence Convention Center in 2009 and for 2010 expanded into a four-day convention. In 2011 due to the lack of available space at the David L. Lawrence Convention Center, the convention moved to the Wyndham Grand Pittsburgh Downtown (formerly Pittsburgh Hilton). The convention celebrated its tenth anniversary and remained at the Wyndham Grand for 2012 while adding a fifth evening of events offsite at the Hollywood Theater Dormont. Due to various issues (crowded staircases, hotel issues, noise complaints including an early shutdown Sunday morning), the convention announced that it would not be returning to the Wyndham Grand for 2013. Tekkoshocon Inc. transferred its property to the Pittsburgh Japanese Culture Society, a non-profit organization, in September 2012. The convention returned to the David L. Lawrence Convention Center starting in 2013, with the name shortened to Tekko for 2014.

Tekko added dressing rooms for cosplayers, non photo cosplay locations, Japanese cultural/educational programming (Tekko Gakkou), and expanded the game room by 50 percent in 2015. Pittsburgh declared it to be Tekko Week during the convention in 2016. Two attendees got married during the cosplay masquerade and portions of the convention were streamed live (TeamTekkoTV). In 2017, Tekko expanded its 18+ programming. The convention in 2019 featured a wrestling show by Big Time Wrestling. Tekko 2020 was moved from April to June due to the COVID-19 pandemic, but was later cancelled. Tekko 2021 was moved from July to December due to the COVID-19 pandemic. The convention had both vaccine and mask rules for the December event.

Tekko launched a GoFundMe in June 2022 to raise funds in order to hold the convention. This was due to 2020's cancellation, 2021's poor attendance, and increased costs. The convention needed $60,000 to rent the convention center, with an overall goal of $100,000 to stabilize finances. Tekko held a fundraiser featuring cars and cosplay in early July 2022 and later a steaming funraiser on Twitch. The convention raised over $65,000 by July 7 and received matching donations from Schell Games.

Event history

Tekko 1/2
Tekko 1/2 was a one-day anime convention created by the staff of Tekkoshocon that included anime showings, cosplay, karaoke, panels, and video games. Due to growth the event moved from the Carnegie Library to the Best Western Parkway Center Inn in 2008.

Event history

KuroKiiro Festival
The KuroKiiro Festival is an educational anime festival that includes a carnival, dance, dancing maid cafe, swap meet, talent show, vendors, video gaming, and workshops. In 2010, KuroKiiro moved to the Boyd Community Center (former school) in Pittsburgh and formed its own maid cafe group called KuroKiiro Cafe. The event returned to the Boyd Community Center in 2011 and was held over Thanksgiving weekend. KuroKiiro again returned to the Boyd Community Center in 2012 and 2013. For 2014 the convention moved to the California University of Pennsylvania Convocation Center in California, Pennsylvania.

Event history

Sangawa Project
The Sangawa Project is an 18+ anime event created by the staff of Tekkoshocon geared towards mature fans that includes an AMV contest, cosplay contest, dealers room, panels, and classic video games. Sangawa's name comes from the Japanese word for "three rivers", in reference to Pittsburgh's nickname. The event acts as a revenue source, along with the KuroKiiro Festival, for Tekkoshocon. For 2014 the convention moved to the DoubleTree by Hilton Hotel Pittsburgh in Pittsburgh, Pennsylvania.

Event history

See also

 List of anime conventions

References

External links
 Official website
 KuroKiiro Festival website
 Sangawa Project website
 Pittsburgh Japanese Culture Society (PJCS) website

Anime conventions in the United States
Recurring events established in 2003
2003 establishments in Pennsylvania
Annual events in Pennsylvania
Festivals in Pennsylvania
Tourist attractions in Allegheny County, Pennsylvania
Culture of Pittsburgh
Asian-American culture in Pittsburgh
Tourist attractions in Pittsburgh
Conventions in Pennsylvania